Biologics for immunosuppression (often called "biologics" or "biological therapy" or "biological drugs") are a class of immunosuppressive drugs which chemically are biopharmaceutical treatments.

Biologics treat medical conditions where immunotherapy is effective. Some conditions which biologics treat are psoriatic arthritis, rheumatism, and inflammatory bowel disease.

Example drugs in this category include adalimumab, certolizumab, etanercept, golimumab, infliximab, belimumab, and ustekinumab.

Medical uses
Biologics provide immunotherapy. For people with moderate to severe psoriatic arthritis, biologics can provide some relief of the symptoms.

Biologics can function as disease-modifying antirheumatic drugs. They can treat inflammatory bowel disease.

Contraindications
Biologics should be used after considering other less invasive treatments. Before using biologics to treat psoriasis, easier treatments of moisturizer or light therapy can provide relief. Other drugs which can provide relief include acitretin, cyclosporine, and methotrexate, but since these drugs have their own major side effects, doctors and patients should discuss whether to try one of these or a biologic first.

Most biologics are injections so are not appropriate for use by someone with intense fear of needles. A person with any infection should not use biologics.

Other contraindications for biologics include cancer, certain neurologic disorders, being pregnant or breastfeeding, history of heart failure, or history of tuberculosis.

Adverse effects
Biologics can cause mild effects including headache, skin reactions, respiratory tract infection, and urinary tract infection.

Potential serious adverse effects include allergic reactions, liver damage, cancer, and serious infections including tuberculosis, pneumonia, staph infection, and fungal infection.

Manufacturing
Genetically engineered cell cultures in large vats produce the biologics.

History
Biologics are the second generation of biopharmaceutical products. The first generation were the biopharmaceutical products which could be extracted from organisms without biotechnology from the Information Age. Those first generation products include blood for transfusion, early insulin extracted from animals, and vaccines from eggs.

When biologic drugs became available they led to significant changes in the management of inflammatory bowel disease.

Society and culture

Term
The term "biologic therapy" is confusing. It can refer to any biopharmaceutical medication. However, many sources use the term to refer to immunotherapy treatments.

The explanation for this is that while "biologic" or "biopharmaceutical" refers to the chemical composition of medications which might be used to treat a range of medical conditions, when the term "biologic" became popular, many biologic medications available provided immunosuppression.

Example biologics
Biologics for immunosuppression include Adalimumab, Certolizumab, etanercept, Golimumab, Infliximab, and ustekinumab.

Legal status
Another related term, biosimilar, is a term for describing a biopharmaceutical product which seems so close in composition and effect to another that they are functionally identical. In this context, some publications describe "biologics" as "biosimilars".

Economics
Biologic drugs are expensive. In the United States treatment with biologic drugs typically costs -6,000 per month.

References

External links
The Changing Drug Landscape - Biologics: the high cost of breakthrough medicine, an 8-minute video by Empire Life about the cost of biologics

Immunotherapy